The 1997 Independence Bowl was a college football postseason bowl rematch between the LSU Tigers and the Notre Dame Fighting Irish.

Background
The Tigers had finished 2nd in the Western Division of the SEC. The Irish went from 1–4 early in the season to 7–5 with wins over Boston College, LSU and West Virginia. This was the second time they faced LSU in 1997. This was LSU's first Independence Bowl since 1995.

Game summary
Notre Dame could only muster two field goals in the first half, but they led 6–3 at halftime in a game clouded by light rain and blustery, cold temperatures. However Wade Richey and Abram Booty got the Tigers into the lead (on a field goal and touchdown reception, respectively) in the 3rd quarter. Trailing 13–6, Notre Dame could only muster one more field goal to narrow the lead as LSU scored twice on Rondell Mealey touchdown runs. Mealey had 34 carries for 222 yards and 2 touchdowns.

Aftermath
Notre Dame defeated LSU 39–36 in South Bend late in the 1998 season. LSU finished 1998 4–7 and was 2–8 in 1999 when coach Gerry DiNardo, an All-American offensive guard at Notre Dame under Ara Parseghian from 1972–74, was fired.

LSU wouldn't reach a bowl game again until 2000 under new coach Nick Saban. Davie led the Irish to the 2001 Fiesta Bowl, where they were blown out by Oregon State. He was fired following a 5–6 campaign in 2001.

Neither team has returned to this bowl since this game.

The Tigers and Fighting Irish have met in three subsequent bowls; LSU won the 2007 Sugar Bowl and Notre Dame the 2014 Music City Bowl and 2018 Citrus Bowl.

Statistics

References

Independence Bowl
Independence Bowl
LSU Tigers football bowl games
Notre Dame Fighting Irish football bowl games
December 1997 sports events in the United States
1997 in sports in Louisiana